The Superleague Formula round Portugal is a round of the Superleague Formula. After hosting rounds at Autódromo do Estoril in 2008 and 2009, the Portuguese round moves to Portimão's Autódromo Internacional do Algarve for 2010.

Winners

References

External links
 Superleague Formula Official Website 
 V12 Racing: Independent Superleague Formula Fansite Magazine

Portugal